Rainbow Dance is a 1936 British animated film, created by New Zealand-born animation pioneer Len Lye and released by the GPO Film Unit. Lye's second film to be viewed by the public, it uses the Gasparcolor process. Credits also list Australian music pioneer Jack Ellitt ("Synchronization") and Frank Jones ("Camera").

Synopsis
A man (Rupert Doone) is holding an umbrella in the rain. Then, he starts dancing, and as he does, the backgrounds completely change. Then, he starts dancing near the ocean, with a woman and fish following. Then, he plays tennis with cel-animated circles as another man watches. A colorful array of shapes follow, and the man sits and thinks, as the shapes come back and images come off the score sheet. The music ends, and a man's voice says the following: 'Post Office Savings Bank puts a pot of gold at the end of the rainbow for you', followed by 'No deposit is too small for the Post Office Savings Bank'.

References

External links
 

1936 films
1936 animated films
British animated short films
Films directed by Len Lye
GPO Film Unit films
British musical films
1936 musical films
1930s English-language films
1930s British films